Pseudalectrias is a monotypic genus of marine ray-finned fishes belonging to the family Stichaeidae, the pricklebacks and shannies. Its only species is Pseudalectrias tarasovi which is found in the northwestern Pacific Ocean.

References

Xiphisterinae
Monotypic ray-finned fish genera